The Kapp Toscana Group is a geologic group in Svalbard and Jan Mayen in the Barents Sea, Norway.

Description 
The group dates back to the Late Triassic, and comprises the rock formations of Tschermakfjellet, De Geerdalen and Wilhelmøya. The group is named from the headland of Kapp Toscana at the southern side of Van Keulenfjorden in Wedel Jarlsberg Land at Spitsbergen, Svalbard.

The Kapp Toscana Group was initially defined as a formation, but has later become a group.

References

Bibliography 
 
 

Geologic groups of Europe
Geologic formations of Norway
Triassic System of Europe
Triassic Norway
Ladinian Stage
Rhaetian Stage
Shale formations
Sandstone formations
Deltaic deposits
Geology of Svalbard
Jan Mayen